The 1969–70 Oakland Seals season was the Seals' third season in the NHL. They qualified for the Stanley Cup playoffs for the second year in a row, and were again eliminated in the first round. It was the last time the Seals qualified for the playoffs.

Offseason

Amateur draft

Regular season

Final standings

Schedule and results

Player statistics

Skaters
Note: GP = Games played; G = Goals; A = Assists; Pts = Points; PIM = Penalties in Minutes

†Denotes player spent time with another team before joining Seals. Stats reflect time with the Seals only. ‡Traded mid-season

Goaltenders
Note: GP = Games played; TOI = Time on ice (minutes); W = Wins; L = Losses; T = Ties; GA = Goals against; SO = Shutouts; GAA = Goals against average

Transactions
The Seals were involved in the following transactions during the 1969–70 season:

Trades

Additions and subtractions

Playoffs
The Seals qualified for the playoffs and went against Pittsburgh in a best-of-seven quarterfinal series.  They were swept in four games, or 0–4.

References
 Seals on Hockey Database
 Seals on Database Hockey

California Golden Seals seasons
Oakland
Oakland